Zion Episcopal Church Complex and Harmony Cemetery is a national historic district comprising a historic Episcopal church complex and cemetery located at Morris in Otsego County, New York. The complex consists of the church, rectory (1893), and parish house (1901).  The church was built in 1818 and is a stone building in the early English Gothic Revival style.  It features a steeply sloping gable roof and a central projecting bell tower with a belfry with a balustrade.  The Harmony Cemetery has burials dating from about 1800 to 1937.

It was listed on the National Register of Historic Places in 1997.

Gallery

References

Episcopal church buildings in New York (state)
Churches on the National Register of Historic Places in New York (state)
Historic districts on the National Register of Historic Places in New York (state)
Gothic Revival church buildings in New York (state)
Churches completed in 1800
Churches in Otsego County, New York
19th-century Episcopal church buildings
National Register of Historic Places in Otsego County, New York